The 1979 Fresno State Bulldogs football team represented California State University, Fresno as a member of the Pacific Coast Athletic Association (PCAA) during the 1979 NCAA Division I-A football season. Led by Bob Padilla in his second and final season as head coach, Fresno State compiled an overall record of 4–7 with a mark of 2–3 in conference play, placing fourth in the PCAA. While Fresno State lost to San Jose State, the game was subsequently forfeited by the Spartans due to the use of an ineligible player. As a result, Fresno State's record was adjusted to 5–6 overall and 3–2 conference play, moving them into a tie for second place in the PCAA.

The Bulldogs played their home games at Ratcliffe Stadium on the campus of Fresno City College in Fresno, California.

Schedule

Team players in the NFL
No Fresno State players were drafted in the 1980 NFL draft.

The following finished their college career in 1979, were not drafted, but played in the NFL.

References

Fresno State
Fresno State Bulldogs football seasons
Fresno State Bulldogs football